Dijon Duenas, (born June 9, 1992) better known as Dijon, is an American musician and producer from Baltimore, Maryland.

Early life
Duenas was born in Germany to a family in the American military stationed abroad, the son of a Guamanian father and a mother from the rural American south of mixed African and European ancestry. His parents met in the military and during his childhood he moved several times to different cities back and forth between the U.S. and Germany. He attended Centennial High School in Ellicott City, Maryland.

Music career
Dijon's music career began as one half of the duo, Abhi//Dijon, which he formed with a high school friend, Abhirath Raju, while they were attending college at the University of Maryland, Baltimore County. Duenas released his first solo EP in 2019 titled Sci Fi 1. Dijon released his second EP, How Do You Feel About Getting Married? in May 2020. Duenas said he was influenced by Little Feat, Burial, and Lucinda Williams. In December 2020, Duenas released a song titled "The Stranger", featuring John C. Reilly, Tobias Jesso Jr., and Becky and the Birds. 

Duenas' debut album Absolutely was released on November 5, 2021.Following his debut album release, Dijon also subsequently released a short film on December 22nd, directed by Jack Karaszewski. Dijon made his television debut on The Tonight Show on January 27, 2022, performing the song "Big Mike's".

Discography

As Dijon 
Studio Albums                                                                                               

 Absolutely (2021)                                                                                           

Extended Plays

 Sci Fi 1 (2019)
 How Do You Feel About Getting Married? (2020)

As Abhi//Dijon 
Extended Plays 

 Montana (2016)
Albums
 2014 (2015)

References

Musicians from Los Angeles
American producers